The Buochserhorn is a mountain of the Swiss Prealps, overlooking Lake Lucerne near Buochs in the canton of Nidwalden. It lies on the range west of the Schwalmis.

References

External links
Buochserhorn on Hikr

Mountains of the Alps
Mountains of Nidwalden
Mountains of Switzerland
One-thousanders of Switzerland